Shane Neumann born 11 July 1987 in Brisbane, Queensland, Australia is a former professional rugby league footballer who played for Canterbury-Bankstown and the Manly-Warringah in the National Rugby League.

Playing career
Neumann made his first grade debut for Manly in Round 10 2007 against Brisbane.  Neumann played 3 seasons for Manly but did not feature in the 2008 premiership winning team.  In 2010, Neumann joined Canterbury and made 6 appearances for the club.  In 2011, Neumann signed with Melbourne but made no appearances for the club before being released.

References

External links
Manly Sea Eagles profile
NRL profile

1987 births
Australian rugby league players
Manly Warringah Sea Eagles players
Canterbury-Bankstown Bulldogs players
Eastern Suburbs Tigers players
Sunshine Coast Sea Eagles players
Rugby league wingers
Rugby league centres
Living people
Rugby league players from Brisbane